The Radical Democratic Party is a liberal party in Bulgaria. The party was founded in 1902 (other sources: 1905) by Naičo Canov and other dissidents from the Democratic Party. From 1918 party was led by Stoyan Kosturkov. It was banned in 1934, revived in 1944 and again banned in 1949.
In 1989 the party was re-established. It elected as its leader Elka Konstantinova. She was succeeded in 1994 by Aleksander Jordanov, and the party became an affiliated member of the Union of Democratic Forces. In 1995 the party split, with one faction remaining inside the Union of Democratic Forces, and another faction becoming an independent party. Though the party still exists, it lacks its former influence.

Electoral results

Parliament

External links
Radical Democratic Party official site 

Defunct political parties in Bulgaria
Bulgaria 1905
Liberal parties in Bulgaria
Radical parties
Formerly banned political parties